Allophylus agbala is a species of plant in the family Sapindaceae. It is endemic to the Democratic Republic of the Congo.

References

Flora of the Democratic Republic of the Congo
agbala
Vulnerable plants
Taxonomy articles created by Polbot